Qualification for women's artistic gymnastic competitions at the 2016 Summer Olympics was held at the HSBC Arena on 7 August 2016. The results of the qualification determined the qualifiers to the finals: 8 teams in the team final, 24 gymnasts in the individual all-around final, and 8 gymnasts in each of 4 apparatus finals. The competition was divided into 5 subdivisions.

Subdivisions
Gymnasts from nations taking part in the team all-around event are grouped together while the other gymnasts are grouped into one of eight mixed groups. The groups were divided into the five subdivisions after a draw held by the Fédération Internationale de Gymnastique. The groups rotate through each of the four apparatuses together.

Subdivision 1

Mixed Group 1

Mixed Group 7

Subdivision 2

Mixed Group 5

Mixed Group 6

Subdivision 3

Mixed Group 8

Subdivision 4

Mixed Group 2

Mixed Group 4

Subdivision 5

Mixed Group 3

Qualification results

Individual all-around final qualifiers

Reserves
The reserves for the individual all-around event final are
 
 
 
 

Only two gymnasts from each country may advance to the all-around final. Therefore, in some cases, a third gymnast placed high enough to qualify, but did not advance to the final because of the quota. Gymnasts who did not advance to the final, but had high enough scores to do so were:
  (3rd place)
  (16th place)
  (22nd place)
  (23rd place)

Vault

Uneven bars

Balance beam

Only two gymnasts from each country may advance to the balance beam final. Therefore, in some cases, a third and/or fourth placed high enough to qualify, but did not advance to the final because of the quota. Gymnasts who did not advance to the final, but had high enough scores to do so were:
  (T-7th place)
  (T-7th place)

Floor exercise

Only two gymnasts from each country may advance to the floor exercise final. Therefore, in some cases, a third and/or fourth gymnast placed high enough to qualify, but did not advance to the final because of the quota. Gymnasts who did not advance to the final, but had high enough scores to do so were:
  (4th place)

References

Women's artistic qualification
2016
2016 in women's gymnastics